Nepal Woman Association is the woman wing of Nepali Congress.

History
Nepal Woman Association was formed by Mangala Devi Singh, the pioneer of Nepalese woman movement. It is the first female political organization of Nepal.

References
 

Feminist organisations in Nepal
Nepali Congress
Women's wings of political parties
1947 establishments in Nepal